The Bush family is an American dynastic family that is prominent in the fields of American politics, news, sports, entertainment, and business. They were the first family of the United States from 1989 to 1993 and again from 2001 to 2009, and was also the second family of the United States from 1981 to 1989, when George H. W. Bush was vice president. The Bush family is one of four families to have produced two presidents of the United States by the same surname; the others were the Adams, Roosevelt, and Harrison families.

Best known for their involvement in politics, family members have held various national and state offices spanning across four generations, including that of U.S. senator (Prescott Bush); governor (Jeb Bush and George W. Bush); and president (George H. W. Bush, who had previously served as vice president, and George W. Bush). Other family members include a National Football League (NFL) executive (Joe Ellis) and two nationally known television personalities (Billy Bush and Jenna Bush Hager).

Biographer Peter Schweizer has described the Bushes as "the most successful political dynasty in American history". The Bush family is of English descent. The Bush family traces its English origin to the 17th century, with Samuel Bush being their first American-born ancestor, in 1647.

Relatives
 James Smith Bush (1825–1889), father of Samuel P. Bush
Samuel Prescott Bush (1863–1948), father of Prescott Bush and son of James Smith Bush
 Flora Sheldon Bush (1870–1920), wife of Samuel P. Bush (married June 20, 1894) and mother to Prescott Bush
Prescott Sheldon Bush (1895–1972), Samuel P. Bush's son, served as a U.S. Senator from Connecticut; former chairman of the USGA.
Dorothy Wear Walker Bush (1901–1992), wife of Prescott, was a daughter of George Herbert Walker of the well-connected Walker family of bankers and businessmen, served as informal First Mother from 1989, her son's inauguration during the beginning of his presidency until her death in 1992, in her son's final year of the presidency.  Her brothers are George Herbert Walker Jr. and John M. Walker
 Prescott Sheldon "Pressy" Bush Jr. (1922–2010), Prescott Bush's eldest son, who served as chairman of the United States-China Chamber of Commerce; married to Elizabeth "Beth" Kauffman (–) on December 30, 1944
 Prescott Sheldon Bush III (–), son of Prescott Bush Jr.; married to Francesca Emerson Farr on June 28, 1970
 Kelsey Bush-Nadeau, daughter of Prescott Bush Jr.; married to Philip Gerald Nadeau on May 25, 1974
 Elizabeth Nadeau, daughter of Kelsey Bush-Nadeau
 Katherine Nadeau, daughter of Kelsey Bush-Nadeau
 William F. Nadeau, son of Kelsey Bush-Nadeau, USMC Captain
 Prescott Nadeau, son of Kelsey Bush-Nadeau
 James Laurence "Jamie" Bush, son of Prescott Bush Jr.; married to Susan C. "Sue" Bush
 Sarah Bush Richey, daughter of James L. Bush; married to William "Drake" Richey
 Draper Dennis Richey 
 George Laurence Richey 
 Beatrice
 Samuel P. Bush, son of James L. Bush
 Auden
 Elliot
 George Herbert Walker Bush (1924–2018), Prescott Bush Sr.'s second son; 41st president of the United States, 43rd vice president under Ronald Reagan, a Representative from Texas, and Central Intelligence Agency director, among other political and diplomatic posts
 Barbara Pierce Bush (1925–2018), wife of George H. W.; daughter of publisher Marvin Pierce, distant cousin of 14th U.S. President Franklin Pierce, Second Lady and later First Lady of the U.S. 
 George Walker Bush (born 1946), George H. W. Bush's eldest son, 43rd president of the United States and (earlier) 46th Governor of Texas
 Laura Lane Welch Bush (born 1946), wife of George W. and First Lady; earlier a librarian 
 Barbara Pierce Bush Coyne (born 1981), daughter of George and Laura Bush and twin sister of Jenna, health care activist and chair of Global Health Corps.; married to Craig Louis Coyne
 Cora Georgia Coyne (born September 27, 2021), daughter of Barbara Bush Coyne
 Jenna Welch Bush Hager (born 1981), daughter of George and Laura and twin sister of Barbara, NBC News correspondent; married to Henry Chase Hager, son of former Lieutenant Governor of Virginia John H. Hager
 Margaret Laura "Mila" Hager (born April 13, 2013), daughter of Jenna Bush Hager
 Poppy Louise Hager (born August 13, 2015), daughter of Jenna Bush Hager
 Henry Harold "Hal" Hager (born August 2, 2019), son of Jenna Bush Hager
 Pauline Robinson "Robin" Bush (1949–1953), George H. W. Bush's second child and first daughter; died of leukemia near school-age
 John Ellis "Jeb" Bush (born 1953), George H. W. Bush's second son, 43rd Governor of Florida; married to Columba Garnica Gallo
 George Prescott Bush (born 1976), son of Jeb Bush, 28th commissioner of the Texas General Land Office since 2015; married to Amanda Williams Bush
 Prescott Walker Bush (born June 3, 2013), son of George P. Bush 
 John William Bush (born April 13, 2015), son of George P. Bush 
 Noelle Lucila Bush (born 1977), daughter of Jeb Bush
 John Ellis "Jebby" Bush Jr. (born 1983), son of Jeb Bush; married to Sandra Mary Algudady
 Georgia Helena Walker Bush (born 2011), daughter of Jebby Bush
 Vivian Alexandra Columba Bush (born 2014), daughter of Jebby Bush
 Neil Mallon Bush (born 1955), third son of George H. W. Bush; businessman; married Sharon Smith, & divorced in April 2003; married to Maria Andrews 
 Lauren Pierce Bush (born 1984), daughter of Neil Bush and Sharon Smith; model for Tommy Hilfiger; married to David Lauren
 James Richard Lauren (born November 21, 2015), son of Lauren Bush Lauren and David Lauren
 Max Walker Lauren (born April 19, 2018), son of Lauren Bush Lauren and David Lauren
 Robert Rocky Lauren (born April 10, 2021), son of Lauren Bush Lauren and David Lauren
 Pierce Mallon Bush (born 1986), son of Neil Bush and Sharon Smith; married to Sarahbeth Melton
 Adeline Grace Elizabeth Bush (born April 21, 2021), daughter of Pierce Bush
 Ashley Walker Bush (born 1989), daughter of Neil Bush and Sharon Smith. Married to Julian LeFevre on March 2, 2019. 
 Marvin Pierce Bush (born 1956), fourth son of George H. W. Bush; venture capitalist; married to Margaret Conway (née Molster); adopted two children 
Marshall Lloyd Bush (born May 14, 1986), adopted daughter of Marvin Pierce Bush. Married to Nick Rossi on November 21, 2015.
Charles Walker Bush (born December 12, 1989), adopted son of Marvin Pierce Bush. Married to Lora Benoit on November 24, 2020.
 Dorothy Walker Bush Koch (born 1959), second daughter of George H. W. Bush; married to, and in 1990 divorced from, William LeBlond; married to Bobby Koch, wine lobbyist
 Samuel Bush LeBlond (born 1984), son of Dorothy Bush Koch and William LeBlond; married to Lee Bobbitt
 Nancy Ellis "Ellie" LeBlond (born 1986), daughter of Dorothy Bush Koch and William LeBlond; married to Nick Sosa
 Dorothy Ann "Dotty" Sosa (born August 25, 2020)
 Robert David Koch (born 1993), son of Dorothy Bush Koch and Bobby Koch. Married to Katherine “Kitty” Montesi on November 13, 2021.
 Georgia Grace "Gigi" Koch (born 1996), daughter of Dorothy Bush Koch and Bobby Koch
 Nancy Walker Bush Ellis (1926–2021), Prescott Bush Sr.'s third child and only daughter, widow of Alexander Ellis II (1922–1989), an insurance executive
 Nancy Walker Ellis Black, daughter of Nancy Bush Ellis and Alexander Ellis II
 Alexander Ellis III (born 1949), son of Nancy Bush Ellis and Alexander Ellis II
 John Prescott Ellis (born February 3, 1953), son of Nancy Bush Ellis and Alexander Ellis II; media consultant; married to Susan Smith Ellis
 Caroline Ellis
 Jack Ellis 
 Josiah "Joe" Ellis (born 1958), son of Nancy Bush Ellis and Alexander Ellis II; President, Chairman and CEO of the Denver Broncos, two-time Super Bowl champion as a member of the Broncos' front office
 Josiah Ellis
 Zander Ellis
 Catherine Ellis
 Jonathan James Bush (1931–2021), Prescott Bush Sr.'s fourth child; banker; married to Josephine Bush (née Bradley)
 Jonathan S. Bush (born March 10, 1969), son of Jonathan Bush, CEO of athenahealth; divorced from Sarah Selden; married to Fay Bush in September 2018
 Lucas Bush, son of Jonathan S. Bush 
 Izzy Bush (born September 20, 1997), daughter of Jonathan S. Bush
 Nicola Bush, daughter of Jonathan S. Bush
 Anna Bush, daughter of Jonathan S. Bush
 Oscar Bush, son of Jonathan S. Bush
 Willa R. Bush (born January 2019), daughter of Jonathan S. Bush and Fay Bush
 William Hall "Billy" Bush (born October 17, 1971), son of Jonathan Bush; a former Access Hollywood host; forced out of NBC-news job October 2016 in allegations about Donald Trump; divorced from Sydney Bush 
 Josie Bush (born August 29, 1998), daughter of Billy Bush and Sydney Bush 
 Mary Bradley Bush (born November 29, 2000), daughter of Billy Bush and Sydney Bush
 Lillie Bush (born October 17, 2004), daughter of Billy Bush and Sydney Bush
 William Henry Trotter "Bucky" Bush (1938–2018), Prescott Bush Sr.'s fifth child; married to Patricia Bush (née Redfearn, 1938–2015); banker and executive
 William Prescott "Scott" Bush (born 1964), son of Bucky Bush; married to Linsday Bush
 Alex Bush (born December 29, 1996), son of Scott Bush
 Kat Bush, daughter of Scott Bush
 Louisa Bush McCall (born 1970), daughter of Bucky Bush

Ancestors

Patrilineal line
 John Bush Sr (1510–1590)
 John Bush Jr (1535–1595)
Reynold Bush (1566–unknown)
 John Bush III (1593–1670), born in Messing, Essex, England and the last English ancestor
 Samuel Bush (1647–1733) 
 Richard Bush (c. 1676–1742 in Bristol, Plymouth Colony) 

 Timothy Bush (1728–1821 in Springport, New York) may have been the son of Richard Bush.
 Timothy Bush Jr. (1761–1850 in Penfield, New York) was the son of Timothy Bush.
 Obadiah Newcomb Bush (January 28, 1797 – 1851) was the son of blacksmith Timothy Bush Jr. and was an American prospector and businessman.
James Smith Bush (1825–1889), an attorney and Episcopal priest in New Jersey, California, and New York, was the son of Obadiah Bush and the father of Samuel Prescott Bush.
 John Bush (1761-unknown)
 George Bush (1796–1859) was a biblical scholar and Swedenborgian minister who wrote the book Life of Mohammed.

Other notable relatives
 Edith Wilson (1872–1961), second wife of U.S. President Woodrow Wilson was also descended from Col. Robert Bolling Sr. so therefore was distantly related to the Bush family.
 Wild Bill Hickok (1837–1876) was a second cousin three times removed of Prescott Bush.
 John Howland (1592/1593–1672/1673) and Elizabeth Tilley (1607–1687), Mayflower passengers, through their daughter Hope.
 Gov. Thomas Hinckley (1618–1706) was a Plymouth Colony governor, and a seventh generation great-grandfather of Prescott Sheldon Bush, so therefore a direct ancestor of all of his descendants including his son George H. W. Bush and grandson George W. Bush.
 Mary Parker (1637–1692) was executed by hanging in 1692 for witchcraft in the Salem Witch Trials.
 Through John May and his wife Prudence Bridge (great-great-grandparents of Obadiah Newcomb Bush), the family is related to U.S. Attorney General Charles Bonaparte (1851–1921), U.S. Vice President Charles Gates Dawes (1865–1951), actress Blanche Oelrichs (who was also known by the pseudonym "Michael Strange") (1890–1950), and author Louisa May Alcott (1832–1888).
Douglas MacArthur (1880–1964), American five star general and Field Marshal of the Philippine Army who was the Supreme Commander for the Allied Powers in the Pacific theater during World War II was distantly related to the Bush family.
Asahel Bush (1824–1913) was an early Oregon pioneer. He started the first Oregon printing shop, and founded and published the Oregon Statesman. He later sold the newspaper and founded the Ladd & Bush Bank. He also was a convention delegate and chairman for the Democratic Party (United States). Asahel Bush II is the namesake for Bush's Pasture Park in Salem, Oregon. Asahel Bush was descended from Samuel Bush (1647–1733).

Connections to other prominent families

George Herbert "Bert" Walker (1875–1953) was a wealthy American banker and businessman. His daughter Dorothy married Prescott Bush, making him the maternal grandfather of the 41st President George H. W. Bush and the great-grandfather of the 43rd President George W. Bush. He is also the namesake of the Walker Cup, a men's amateur golf trophy contested in odd-numbered years between a U.S. team and a combined Great Britain and Ireland side.

Flora Sheldon, wife of Samuel P. Bush, was a distant descendant of the Livingston, Schuyler, and Beekman families, prominent New Netherland merchant and political patrician families.

Barack Obama is the 10th cousin once-removed of George W Bush, through Samuel Hinkley of Cape Cod.

Family tree

 Richard Bush, m. Mary Fairbanks
 Timothy Bush, m. Deborah House
 Timothy Bush Jr., m. Lydia Newcomb
  Obadiah Newcomb Bush (1797–1851), m. Harriet Smith
  James Smith Bush, m. Harriet Fay
  Samuel Prescott Bush, m. Flora Sheldon
 Prescott Sheldon Bush, m. Dorothy Wear Walker
 Prescott Sheldon Bush Jr., m. Elizabeth Kauffman
 Prescott Sheldon Bush III, m. Francesca Emerson Farr
 Kelsey Bush-Nadeau, m. Philip Gerald Nadeau
 Elizabeth Nadeau
 Katherine Nadeau
 William F. Nadeau, m. Lydia Jean Strickland
  James Laurence "Jamie" Bush, m. Susan C. "Sue" Bush
 Sarah Bush Richey, m. William "Drake" Richey
 Draper Dennis Richey
  George Laurence Richey
 Samuel P. Bush
 George H. W. Bush, m. Barbara Pierce 
 George W. Bush, m. Laura Lane Welch 
 Barbara Pierce Bush (b. November 25, 1981), m. Craig Louis Coyne
 Cora Coyne
  Jenna Welch Bush (b. November 25, 1981), m. Henry Chase Hager
 Margaret Laura "Mila" Hager
 Poppy Louise Hager
  Henry Harold "Hal" Hager
 Pauline Robinson "Robin" Bush
 John Ellis "Jeb" Bush, m. Columba Garnica Gallo
 George Prescott Bush (b. April 24, 1976), m. Amanda Williams
 Prescott Bush 
  John Bush
 John Ellis "Jebby" Bush Jr. (b. 1983)
 Georgia H.W. Bush
  Vivian Alexandra Columba Bush
  Noelle Lucila Bush (b. 1977)
 Neil Mallon Bush, (m./div. 1st) Sharon Smith ; (m. 2nd) Maria Andrews
 Lauren Bush (b. June 25, 1984), m. David Lauren
 James Richard Lauren
  Max Walker Lauren 
 Pierce Mallon Bush (b. March 11, 1986), m. Sarahbeth Melton
  Ashley Walker Bush (b. February 7, 1989)
 Marvin Pierce Bush, m. Margaret Molster
 Marshall Lloyd Bush (b. May 14, 1986)
  Charles Walker Bush (b. December 12, 1989)
  Dorothy Walker Bush, (m./div. 1st) William LeBlond ; (m. 2nd) Robert P. Koch
 Samuel "Sam" LeBlond (b. 1985)
 Nancy Ellis "Ellie" LeBlond (b. 1988), m. Nick Sosa
 Robert David Koch (b. 1993)
  Georgia "Gigi" Koch (b. 1996)
 Nancy Walker Bush, m. Alexander B. Ellis II
 Nancy Walker Ellis
 Alexander Ellis III
 John Prescott Ellis
  Joe Ellis
 Jonathan James Bush, m. Josephine Bradley
 Billy Bush, m. Sydney Davis
 Josie Bush
 Mary Bradley Bush
  Lillie Bush
  Jonathan S. Bush
 Nicola Bush
 Isabelle Bush
 Lucas Bush
 Anna Bush
 Oscar Bush
 Willa Bush
  William Henry Trotter Bush
 William Prescott Bush 
  Louisa Bush
 Robert Sheldon Bush
 Mary Eleanor Bush
 Margaret Livingston Bush
  James Smith Bush

Sources:

Awards and honors

Sports
Two-time Super Bowl champion – Joe Ellis (as an executive with the Denver Broncos)
1986 Theodore Roosevelt Award – George H.W. Bush
2007 National Football Foundation Gold Medal – George H. W. Bush
World Golf Hall of Fame – George H. W. Bush (class of 2011)

Politics/public service
Three-time Time Person of the Year
George H. W. Bush (1990)
George W. Bush (2000, 2004)
Two-time Silver Buffalo Award winners
George H. W. Bush (1990)
George W. Bush (2002)
Seven statues
George H.W. Bush – three (Houston, TX, Rapid City, SD, Washington, D.C.)
George W. Bush – three (Rapid City, SD, Hamilton, OH, Fushe Kruje, Albania)
George H.W./George W. Bush (shared) – one (Dallas, TX)
1989: Jersey Street in College Station, TX renamed George Bush Drive in honor of George H.W. Bush
1997: George Bush Intercontinental Airport named in honor of George H. W. Bush
2007: Ronald Reagan Freedom Award – George H. W. Bush
2010: Presidential Medal of Freedom – George H. W. Bush
2013: Portion of U.S. Highway 75 in Dallas, TX renamed George W. Bush Expressway

Military
Presidential Unit Citation – George H. W. Bush
Distinguished Flying Cross – George H. W. Bush
Three-time Air Medal recipient – George H. W. Bush
Honorary Knight Grand Cross of the Order of the Bath – George H. W. Bush
Commander of the Order of St John – William H. T. Bush
USS George H.W. Bush commissioned in 2009 – George H.W. Bush
National Defense Service Medal – George W. Bush, George P. Bush
Joint Service Commendation Medal – George P. Bush

Political offices held

President
George H. W. Bush (41st) – 1989–1993 
George W. Bush (43rd) – 2001–2009

Vice President
George H. W. Bush (43rd) – 1981–1989

U.S. Congress
Prescott Bush (Senator from Connecticut) – 1952–1963
George H. W. Bush (Representative from Texas) – 1967–1971

Governor
George W. Bush (Texas) – 1995–2000
Jeb Bush (Florida) – 1999–2007

Other
George H. W. Bush
UN Ambassador (1971–1973)
RNC Chairman (1973–1974)
Ambassador to China (1974–1975)
CIA Director (1976–1977)
Jeb Bush
Florida Secretary of Commerce (1987–1989)
George P. Bush
Texas Land Commissioner (2015–2023)

See also
List of presidents of the United States
List of Bush family members
Political families of the world

References

Further reading
 American Dynasty: Aristocracy, Fortune, and the Politics of Deceit in the House of Bush (2004), Kevin Phillips. 
 The Bushes: Portrait of a Dynasty, Peter Schweizer

External links
Victory restores Bush dynasty to Washington from CNN
The Bush dynasty parties on from the St. Petersburg Times

 
American families of English ancestry
American families of Dutch ancestry
Business families of the United States
First Families of the United States
Texas Republicans
Florida Republicans